Mani Hoffman (born 18 December 1975) is a French singer, songwriter and music producer.

In 2001, he collaborated with The Supermen Lovers, and co-wrote the platinum hit, "Starlight", with Guillaume Atlan, and is lead singer on the song. It became one of the most exported French tracks around the world, and made Mani an important figure of French Touch movement along with Daft Punk, Cassius, Modjo and others. Over the next few years, Mani worked with French and English house/electro artists, such as DJ Cole, DJ Fudge, Trouble Men, Frank Roger, School, Junior Jack, and JC Sindress and Bel Amour. During this time, Mani signed with multiple labels, such as BMG, Sony, and Warner Music.

In 2006, Hoffman released another big hit, "Lucy", with the band, Jealousy, which was in the Top 20 in UK. While in the UK, he collaborated with Toby Smith, founder of the group Jamiroquai, and was also signed by his label, Angelic Union.

Mani Hoffman has also been involved with film scoring. In 2009, he wrote and sang on the original soundtrack for the film, R.T.T., starring Kad Merad and Mélanie Doutey. He also composed for the French television music, mockumentary series, Zak, broadcast on Orange Movie Series since November 2011.

In January 2012, the group  released their debut album, Heroes of Today, with the first single, "Bang Bang", produced by the community label My Major Company. The group formed in 2007 with Tony le Guern (keyboard and arranger), Paco (guitar), and his childhood friends, Ben Durand (bass), and Stan Augris (drums), who were originally part of the group Mainstreet. "Bang Bang" was a global radio hit, and was in the Top 10 of the airplay and video play charts in France, Belgium, and Switzerland, and the No. 2 airplay single in Japan in 2013. It was also featured in the Samsung Galaxy commercial there.

Also in 2012, Mani composed and performed the track, Une chose à la fois, with Petula Clark.

Mani Hoffman was born in Nantes, France, to Jewish refugees from Algeria. At age 8, his family moved to Paris.

Discography

 2000 - Bel amour - Bel amour
 2000 – SCHOOL – Ain't no love
 2001 – SHADE OF SOUL feat. MANI HOFFMAN – Our Music
 2001 – THE SUPERMEN LOVERS feat. MANI HOFFMAN – Starlight
 2002 – THE SUPERMEN LOVERS feat. MANI HOFFMAN – THE PLAYER – Intro
 2002 – THE SUPERMEN LOVERS feat. MANI HOFFMAN – THE PLAYER – Material World
 2002 – SCHOOL – If
 2002 – SHADE OF SOUL feat. MANI HOFFMAN – Nu Stance
 2002 – WORK FOR BEAUTY – The Thing
 2003 – MANI HOFFMAN & THE MILK BROTHERS – Don't Stop
 2003 – TROUBLEMEN feat. MANI HOFFMAN – Deep in my soul
 2005 – FRANK ROGER feat. MANI HOFFMAN – Right make it right
 2005 – DJ FUDGE feat. MANI HOFFMAN – Keep On
 2006 – DJ FUDGE feat. MANI HOFFMAN – Chasing Love
 2006 – DJ FUDGE feat. MANI HOFFMAN – Nightglows
 2006 – DJ FLEX feat. MANI HOFFMAN – Getaway
 2006 – JEALOUSY – Lucy
 2007 – JEALOUSY – Sing
 2008 – DJ FUDGE feat. MANI HOFFMAN – Liv & Love
 2008 – BEAT ASSAILANT feat. MANI HOFFMAN & JRF – Better Than Us
 2009 – FRANK ROGER feat. MANI HOFFMAN – Dangerous girl
 2009 – MM'S feat. MANI HOFFMAN – RTT (B.O.F) – Where do you go ?
 2009 – MM'S feat. MANI HOFFMAN – RTT (B.O.F) – It is you
 2009 – MM'S feat. MANI HOFFMAN – RTT (B.O.F) – You're the kinda girl
 2010 – AVI ELMAN & DANNY J feat. MANI HOFFMAN – Love is Not For Hire
 2011 – IDAN K & THE MOVEMENT OF RHYTHM feat. MANI HOFFMAN – Better man
 2012 – DJ FUDGE & EZEL feat. MANI HOFFMAN – Call My Name
 2012 – TELEKA & MM'S feat. MANI, THE FOREIGN BEGGARS & REEMSTARR – Legacy
 2012 – UNION feat. MANI HOFFMAN – Baby Mama
 2012 – PETULA CLARK feat. MANI – Une chose à la fois
 2012 – COMBOSTAR feat. MANI HOFFMAN – Free
 2012 – ALEX KASSEL feat. MANI HOFFMAN – Put your money where your mouth is
 2012 – MANI, "Heroes of Today"
 2013 – BANG, BANG single No. 2 in Japan airplay
 2014 – BIG SHOTS used as Heineken worldwide holiday campaign
 2015 – BETTER HALF single release by Dos Bandidos
 2015 – RABID ANIMALS feat. THE LEONS, included in The Transporter Refueled

References

Living people
English-language singers from France
French composers
French male composers
French record producers
21st-century French Jews
French people of Algerian-Jewish descent
1975 births
21st-century French singers
21st-century French male singers